RMS Empress of Britain was a steam turbine ocean liner built between 1928 and 1931 by John Brown shipyard in Scotland, owned by the Canadian Pacific Railway Company and operated by Canadian Pacific Steamship Company. She was the second of three Canadian Pacific ships named Empress of Britain, which provided scheduled trans-Atlantic passenger service from spring to autumn between Canada and Europe from 1931 until 1939.

In her time Empress of Britain was the largest, fastest and most luxurious ship between the United Kingdom and Canada, and the largest ship in the Canadian Pacific fleet. At  she was the largest liner lost in the Second World War and the largest ship sunk by a U-boat.

Design and building

Work began on Empress of Britain on 28 November 1928 when the plates of her keel were laid at John Brown & Co, Clydebank, Scotland. She was launched on 11 June 1930 by the Prince of Wales. This was the first time that launching ceremonies in Britain were broadcast by radio to Canada and the United States.

Eight were Yarrow boilers, but as an experiment she was also the first to be fitted with a Johnson boiler. Her boilers supplied steam at 425 lbf/in2 to 12 steam turbines, which drove her four propeller shafts by single reduction gearing and developed a combined power output of 12,753 NHP.

Empress of Britains UK official number was 162582. Until 1933 her code letters were LHCB. Her call sign was GMBJ.

The ship began sea trials on 11 April 1931 where she recorded , and left Southampton on her maiden voyage to Quebec on 27 May 1931.

As the ship would sail a more northerly trans-Atlantic route where there was sometimes ice in the waters off Newfoundland, Empress of Britain was ordered with outer steel plating double the thickness at the stem and for  back at either side, up to the waterline. Her sea trials showed her to be "the world's most economical steamship for fuel consumption per horsepower-hour for her day."

Her primary role was to entice passengers between England and Quebec instead of the more popular Southampton–New York route. The ship was designed to carry 1,195 passengers (465 first class, 260 tourist class and 470 third class).

She was the first passenger liner designed specifically to become a cruise ship in winter when the St. Lawrence River was frozen. Empress of Britain was annually converted into an all-first-class, luxury cruise ship, carrying 700 passengers.

When passing through Panama, there were only  between the ship and the canal lock wall. She was powered by 12 steam turbines driving four propellers: the two inboard took two-thirds of the power, the outboard one-third. For cruising two engines were shut down and the two outboard propellers removed since speed was less important on a cruise. The efficiency of this arrangement became clear in service – in transatlantic service, she consumed 356 tons of oil a day, while on her 1932 cruise, consumption fell to 179.

To serve as a beacon at night during emergencies her three funnels were illuminated by powerful floodlights. From the air the funnels could be spotted 50 miles away and ships could see the illuminated funnels at 30 miles distance.

Peacetime commercial service
After sea trials, the ship headed for Southampton to prepare for her maiden voyage to Quebec City. Canadian Pacific posters proclaimed the ship the "Five Day Atlantic Giantess", "Canada's Challenger" and "The World's Wondership".

The night before her maiden voyage, the Prince of Wales decided to go to Southampton to bid bon voyage. His inspection of the ship caused a short delay but at 1:12pm on Wednesday, 27 May 1931 Empress of Britain left Southampton for Quebec. Once at sea, the Toronto newspaper The Globe ran an editorial on what the ship meant to Canadians. 
“Canadian enterprise has issued a new challenge in the world of shipping by the completion and sailing of the Empress of Britain from England for Quebec. This giant Canadian Pacific liner of 42,500 tons sets a new standard for the Canadian route. Its luxurious equipment includes one entire deck for sport and recreation, another for public rooms, including a ballroom, with decorations by world-famous artists. There are apartments instead of cabins, and each is equipped with a radio receiving set for the entertainment of passengers. . . . In the later years of the last century, … there was long agitation for a ‘fast Atlantic service’. Time has brought the answer. Despite the current depression, Canada has a new ship which will reach far for traffic during the St. Lawrence season, and when winter comes will go on world cruises, carrying passengers who will ask and receive almost the last word in comfort and luxury in ocean travel. The first journey of the new Empress is a historic event in the record of Canadian advancement.”

Empress of Britain made nine round-trips in 1931 between Southampton and Quebec, carrying 4,891 passengers westbound and 4,696 eastbound. To begin her winter cruise, she made a westbound trans-Atlantic trip to New York, carrying 378. On 3 December 1931, she sailed on a 128-day round-the-world cruise, to the Mediterranean, North Africa and the Holy Land, through the Suez Canal and into the Red Sea, then to India, Ceylon, Southeast Asia and the Dutch East Indies, on to China, Hong Kong and Japan, then across the Pacific to Hawaii and California before traversing the Panama Canal back to New York. The ship then made a one-way Atlantic crossing from New York to Southampton, where she entered dry dock for maintenance and reinstallation of her outer propellers. Until 1939, this schedule was duplicated with minor adjustments each year except 1933.

Her captain from 1934 to 1937 was Ronald Niel Stuart, VC, a First World War veteran entitled to fly the Blue Ensign.

Canadian Pacific hoped to convince Midwesterners from Canada and the United States to travel by train to Quebec City as opposed to New York City. This gave an extra day and a half of smooth sailing in the shorter, sheltered St Lawrence River transatlantic route, which Canadian Pacific advertised as "39 per cent less ocean". While initially successful, the novelty wore off, and Empress of Britain proved to be one of the least profitable liners from the 1930s.

Captain WG Busk-Wood was Master of Empress of Britain when the ship visited Sydney from 2–4 April, and Melbourne on 6 April 1938. She was the largest liner to have visited Australia. A crowd of 250,000 turned out to welcome the liner in Melbourne and the event was reported in The Argus newspaper Thursday 7 April 1938.

In June 1939 Empress of Britain sailed from Halifax to Conception Bay, St Johns, Newfoundland and then eastbound to Southampton with her smallest passenger list. 40 passengers were on board: King George VI, Queen Elizabeth and 13 ladies and lords in waiting, 22 household staff, plus a photographer and two reporters. The royal couple and their entourage were comfortably settled in a string of suites. After this voyage, Empress of Britain returned to regular transatlantic service, but through summer 1939, war loomed.

On 2 September 1939, one day before the United Kingdom declared war (seven days before Canada entered the war), Empress of Britain sailed on her last voyage for Canadian Pacific, with the largest passenger list in her history. Filled beyond capacity, and with temporary berths in the squash court and other spaces, Empress of Britain zig-zagged across the Atlantic, arriving in Quebec on 8 September 1939.

War service

Upon arrival, the ship was repainted grey and then laid up awaiting orders. On 25 November 1939, Empress of Britain was requisitioned as a troop transport. First, she did four transatlantic trips taking troops from Canada to England.

In August 1940 Empress of Britain transported troops to Suez via Cape Town, returning with 224 military personnel and civilians, plus a crew of 419.

Sinking

At around 9:20 am on 26 October 1940, travelling about 70 miles northwest of Ireland along the west coast, Empress of Britain was spotted by a German Focke-Wulf Fw 200C Condor long-range bomber, commanded by Oberleutnant Bernhard Jope. Jope's bomber strafed Empress of Britain three times and struck her twice with  bombs.

Only after Jope returned to base in northern France was it discovered which ship he had attacked. A telex was sent to German Supreme Headquarters. Realising the significance, a reconnaissance plane went to verify; and the German news agency reported that Empress of Britain had been sunk: 
"The Empress of Britain was successfully attacked by German bombers on Saturday morning within the waters of Northern Ireland. The ship was badly hit and began to sink at once. The crew took to their boats."

Despite the ferocity of Jope's attack and the fires, there were few casualties. Bombs started a fire that began to overwhelm the ship. At 9:50am, Captain Sapworth gave the order to abandon ship. The fire was concentrated in the midsection, causing passengers to head for the bow and stern, and hampering launching of the lifeboats. A skeleton crew remained aboard.

The fire left the ship unable to move under her own power, but she was not sinking and the hull appeared intact despite a slight list. At 9:30am on 27 October, a party from  went on board and attached tow ropes. The oceangoing tugs  and  had arrived and took the hulk under tow.

The , commanded by Hans Jenisch, had been told and headed in that direction. He had to dive due to the flying boats, but that night, using hydrophones (passive sonar), located the ships and closed in on them. The destroyers were zigzagging in escort; U-32 placed herself between them and Empress of Britain, from where she fired two torpedoes. The first detonated prematurely; the second, however, hit, causing a massive explosion. Crews of the destroyers speculated this was caused by the fires aboard the liner reaching her fuel tanks. Jenisch manoeuvred U-32 and fired a third torpedo, which hit the ship just aft of the earlier one. The ship began to fill with water and list heavily.

Gold and salvage
It was suspected that she had been carrying gold. The British Empire was shipping gold to North America to improve its credit and pay its debt (bills for supplies). South Africa was a gold producer, and Empress of Britain had recently berthed in Cape Town. Most of the consignments of gold were transported from Cape Town to Sydney, Australia, and from there to America; there were not enough suitable ships and the gold was frequently held up in Sydney. It is possible that, as a result of this delay, Empress of Britain was taking gold from Cape Town to England, from where it could be moved across the Atlantic.

On 8 January 1949, the Daily Mail reported that a salvage attempt was to be made in the summer of that year. There were no follow-ups, and the story contained errors. In 1985, a potential salvager received a letter from the Department of Transport Shipping Policy Unit saying the gold on board had been recovered.

Using saturation diving, they found that the fire had destroyed most of the decks, leaving a largely empty shell rising from the sea floor. The bullion room, however, was still intact. Inside was a skeleton but no gold. It is suspected the gold was unloaded when the Empress of Britain was on fire and its passengers evacuated. The body inside the bullion room may have been that of someone involved in salvage.

In popular culture
In 1990, Robert Seamer wrote The Floating Inferno: The Story of the Loss of the Empress of Britain. He was on the ship when she was torpedoed and sunk. The 1989 novel The White Empress by Lyn Andrews is set on board Empress of Britain. The 2018 novel Empress by Brian McPhee was inspired by the ship, and features a fictionalised account of the skeleton in the bullion room. The 1993 novel 'Closed Circle' by Robert Goddard partly takes place on board 'Empress of Britain'.

See also
 Treasure hunting (marine)
 CP Ships

References

Further reading
 Choco, Mark H, and Jones, David L. (1988). Canadian Pacific Posters, 1883-1963. Montreal: Meridian Press. 
 Coleman, Terry. (1977). The Liners: A History of the North Atlantic Crossing. New York: G. P. Putnam's Sons.] ; 
 Harvey, Clive. (2004). RMS Empress Of Britain: Britain's Finest Liner. Stroud (England): Tempus Publishing. ; OCLC 56462669
 McAuley, Rob and Miller, William. (1997). The Liners: A Voyage of Discovery. Osceola, Wisconsin: Motorbooks International Publishers & Wholesalers. ; OCLC 38144342
 Miller, William H. (1985). The Fabulous Interiors of the Great Ocean Liners in Historic Photographs.. New York: Dover Publications. ; OCLC 10697284 
 __. (1981). The Great Luxury Liners, 1927–1954: a Photographic Record. New York: Dover Publications. ; 
 Mitchell, WH and Sawyer, LA. (1967) Cruising Ships New York: Doubleday
 Musk, George. (1981). Canadian Pacific: The Story of the Famous Shipping Line. Newton Abbot: David & Charles. 
 Pickford, Nigel. (1999). Lost Treasure Ships of the Twentieth Century, Washington, D.C.: National Geographic. ; OCLC 40964695
 Seamer, Robert. (1990). The Floating Inferno: The Story of the Loss of the Empress of Britain. Wellingborough: Stephens. ; OCLC 59892514
 Turner, Gordon. (1992). Empress of Britain: Canadian Pacific's Greatest Ship. Toronto: Stoddart. .
 Watson-Smyth, Kate. "Salvage team dives for £1bn wartime treasure," The Independent (London). 9 November 1998.

External links

 Information about Empress of Britain
 www.oceanlinermuseum.co.uk: History of RMS Empress of Britain
 www.oceanlinermuseum.co.uk: Launch of RMS Empress of Britain, June 1930
 IWM Interview with survivor Bertram Fryer

 

1930 ships
Maritime incidents in October 1940
Ocean liners of the United Kingdom
Ship fires
Ships built on the River Clyde
Ships of CP Ships
Ships sunk by German submarines in World War II
Shipwrecks of Ireland
Steamships of the United Kingdom
Troop ships of the United Kingdom
World War II shipwrecks in the Atlantic Ocean